John Tufton may refer to:
John Tufton (cricketer) (1773–1799), cricketer and MP for Appleby 1796–1799
Sir John Tufton, 1st Baronet (died 1624), see Earl of Thanet
John Tufton, 2nd Earl of Thanet (1608–1664), English nobleman, supporter of Charles I
John Tufton, 4th Earl of Thanet (1638–1680), English nobleman
Sir John Tufton, 2nd Baronet (1620s–1685), MP for Kent
John Tufton (Steyning MP), MP for Steyning in 1679–81
John Tufton, 2nd Baron Hothfield (1873–1952), British Army officer, farmer and land owner, and cricketer